Miss World America 2018 was the 10th edition of the Miss World America pageant where Clarissa Bowers of Florida crowned her successor Marisa Butler of Maine at the end of the event, Butler then represented the United States at the Miss World 2018 pageant on December 8th in Sanya, China and placed in the Top 30. This edition of the pageant was different from previous editions because the winner was selected through a video submission contest and audition process as opposed to previous editions where there had been an actual pageant.

Results

Finalists
The Miss World America 2018 Top 10 finalists are (in alphabetical order) :

Other pageant notes

Withdrawals

Returns
Last competed in 2015:

Last competed in 2016:

Did not compete

Crossovers
Contestants who previously competed  at or will be competing at other beauty pageants:
Miss Universe
2022:: Ashley Cariño (Top 5) (as )

Miss World America
2016: : Azia Hernandez (Top 12)  
2016: : Shivali Patel (1st Runner-up)
2017: : Shivali Patel (Top 16)
2020: : Manju Bangalore (Top 10)
2020: : Molly May (Top 5)

Miss USA
2016: : Marisa Butler
2018: : Daescia Demoranville
2021: : Ashley Barreto (as Ashley Cariño; 2nd Runner-Up)

Miss International
2019: : Raquel Basco (Miss International Oceania, as )

National American Miss Jr. Teen
2011: : Shivali Patel (2nd runner-up)

Miss Intercontinental
2017: : Raquel Basco (as )

Miss America's Outstanding Teen
2013: : Molly May (4th runner-up)

Miss Earth USA
2021: : Marisa Butler (Winner)

Miss Earth
2021: : Marisa Butler (1st Runner-up/Miss Earth Air; as )

Miss Supranational USA
2020: : Shivali Patel (Winner)

Miss Supranational
2021: : Shivali Patel (as )

References

2018
2018 beauty pageants
2018 in the United States